Rissoides is a genus of mantis shrimp. It is named after Antoine Risso, and includes the following species:
Rissoides africanus (Manning, 1974)
Rissoides barnardi (Manning, 1975)
Rissoides calypso (Manning, 1974)
Rissoides desmaresti (Risso, 1816)
Rissoides pallidus (Giesbrecht, 1910)

References

Stomatopoda
Taxa named by Raymond B. Manning